The Czech Republic competed at the 2022 World Aquatics Championships in Budapest, Hungary from 17 June to 3 July.

Artistic swimming

The Czech Republic's artistic swimming team consisted of 2 athletes (2 female).

Women

Open water swimming

Czech Republic qualified two male and one female open water swimmers.

Men

Women

Swimming

Czech Republic entered three swimmers.

Men

Women

References

World Aquatics Championships
2022
Nations at the 2022 World Aquatics Championships